Sergey Nikolaev (born February 5, 1988 in Moscow) is a Russian cyclist, who last rode for UCI Continental team .

Major results

2011
 4th Grand Prix of Moscow
2012
 2nd Overall Friendship People North-Caucasus Stage Race
1st Stage 3
 8th Race Horizon Park
2013
 1st Memorial Viktor Kapitonov
 1st Stage 4 Friendship People North-Caucasus Stage Race
 1st Stage 3 (TTT) Tour des Fjords
 5th Overall Okolo Slovenska
1st Points classification
1st Stage 2
 9th Central European Tour Budapest GP
 10th Grand Prix of Sochi
2014
 Grand Prix Udmurtskaya Pravda
1st Points classification
1st Stages 2 & 3
 1st Prologue Five Rings of Moscow
 3rd Overall Tour de Serbie
1st  Mountains classification
 5th Grand Prix Sarajevo
 8th Poreč Trophy
 9th Overall Grand Prix of Adygeya
2015
 1st  Mountains classification Okolo Slovenska
 1st Prologue Five Rings of Moscow
 2nd Time trial, National Road Championships
 2nd Overall Istrian Spring Trophy
1st Stage 1
 2nd Overall Grand Prix of Adygeya
1st Stage 1 (TTT)
 3rd Overall Tour of Kuban
 3rd Trofej Umag
 4th Overall Grand Prix of Sochi
1st Stage 1 (TTT)
 4th Maykop–Ulyap–Maykop
 4th Duo Normand (with Andrey Solomennikov)
 5th Memorial Oleg Dyachenko
 6th Poreč Trophy
 8th Krasnodar–Anapa
 9th GP Izola
 10th Overall Sibiu Cycling Tour
 10th Grote Prijs Jef Scherens

References

External links

1988 births
Living people
Russian male cyclists
Cyclists from Moscow